Mahasamar is a 2013 Assamese drama film directed by Johns Mahaliya and produced by Hira Gohain. The film tells a story about deforestation. Director and producer claimed that they made the film to aware people against ruthless deforestation. The film  was released in theatres on 22 November 2013.

Plot 
Some traitors, corrupt politicians, dishonest government employees and local wood-mafias were destroying the vegetation of Pipraguri. An honest journalist and dutiful government employee became an obstacle for them. The appointed antisocial rough to keep up the power. At that time, a brave forest ranger officer arrived there and raised voice against the terror.

Cast 
 Nipon Goswami
 Dinesh Das
 Arun Nath
 Junu Baruah
 Deepak Nath
 Arun Hazarika
 Atul Pachani
 Ratul Deka
 Aimee Baruah

Production 
The film, produced by Hira Gohain, was distributed by Siddhartha Television of Tezpur. The film was shot with red camera and cinematographed by Krishna Shah. The songs were filmed at Tawang, Shillong, Shilghat, Nameri. With full of action, romance and entertainment, the movie was choreographed by Jini Mahaliyai. Editing was done by Pranjal Kashyap.

Music 
Music of the film was composed by Diganta Sharma and Abhijit Barman. Lalmohan rosogolla named an item song was sung by Bobita Sharma and performed on screen by Ukrainian dancer Arenai.

Release 
The film was censored on 28 October 2013. It was specially screened and released on 22 November on the same year.

Recognition 
Aimee Baruah was nominated for Best Actor Female in 2013 Filmfare Awards East for Assamese film category. Arun Nath won the second best actor at the Rodali awards.

References

2013 films
Indian drama films
2013 drama films
Films set in Assam
2010s Assamese-language films